The Acoustic Chapel Sessions is a live album by Australian singer, John Farnham. It was released through Sony BMG, as a CD/DVD package in September 2011 and the album peaked at number 10 on the ARIA Charts.

The CD, recorded at Chapel off Chapel in July of that year, consists of eleven of Farnham's songs stripped back and in acoustic mode. The DVD package includes eight songs plus interviews with the artist and his backing band members, and behind-the-scenes footage.

Background

The release of The Acoustic Chapel Sessions coincides with the 25th anniversary of Whispering Jack, Australia's highest-selling and most successful album ever.

John Farnham explained, "We wanted to rework some of the songs that we have been doing on stage for the last 25 years. It's always difficult to rework something that people are very used to, having said that we have had a lot of fun doing it'. Farnham's manager, Glenn Wheatley, added, "This recording has just given me goose bumps; it's amazing seeing the songs stripped right back and all acoustic. I wonder why we didn't think about doing this earlier".

Tour and promotion

Farnham toured the album nationally in October and November 2011 in intimate venues with smaller audiences than his large stadium shows. Patrick McDonald of Adelaide Now said of the tour, "Magic was the right word. For all the flack he cops about endless comebacks, it would truly be a crime if 'The Voice' was ever silenced."

A music video of "Pressure Down" was released to further promote the album.

Review

Jon O'Brien of AllMusic gave the album 3 out of 5. He said that the majority of the album adheres to the "if it ain't broke.." approach but complimented the conviction on "Pressure Down" which abandons its synth-heavy AOR sound in favor of a subtle and soulful gospel vibe, and "Two Strong Hearts", which transforms the impassioned MOR staple into a seductive slice of lounge-pop. O'Brien did comment that the acoustic setting meant some of his bigger/bolder tracks lost their anthemic appeal, in particular "Age of Reason" and "You're the Voice" which removes the bagpipe solo that made it so memorable.

Track listing
Disc 1 CD
 Pressure Down - 4:11
 Reasons - 3:55
 Chain Reaction - 3:09
 Playing to Win - 3:01
 You're the Voice - 4:00
 That's Freedom - 4:18
 Two Strong Hearts - 3:27
 Age Of Reason - 4:59
 Talk of the Town - 3:51
 A Simple Life - 4:04
 Heart's on Fire - 4:47

Disc 2 DVD
 Talk of the Town
 Chain Reaction
 Two Strong Hearts
 Pressure Down
 Hearts on Fire
 A Simple Life
 Age of Reason
 Playing to Win

Charts

The Acoustic Chapel Sessions debuted and peaked on the week commencing 10 October 2011.

Weekly charts

Credits

 Acoustic Bass – Craig Newman
 Acoustic Guitar – Brett Garsed, Stuart Fraser
 Backing Vocals – Lindsay Field, Lisa Edwards, Rod Davies, Susie Ahern
 Banjo – Brett Garsed
 Drums – Angus Burchall
 Electric Bass – Craig Newman
 Electric Piano – Chong Lim
 Engineer – Doug Brady
 Harmonica – Steve Williams
 Mixed By – Doug Brady
 Piano – Chong Lim
 Producer – Ross Fraser
 Soprano Saxophone – Steve Williams
 Vocals – John Farnham

References 

John Farnham live albums
2011 live albums